Heinz Aldinger (born January 7, 1933) is a retired German football referee. He was a linesman at the 1974 FIFA World Cup and refereed one match in the 1980 UEFA European Football Championship in Italy.

He also refereed the 1978 European Cup-Winners' Cup final between Anderlecht and Austria Vienna in Paris.

References
Biography

External links
 Profile at worldfootball.net

1933 births
Living people
German football referees
UEFA Euro 1980 referees
20th-century German people